Ljubomir "Ljuba" Tadić (31 May 1929 – 28 October 2005) was a Yugoslav actor who enjoyed a reputation as one of the greatest names in the history of former Yugoslav cinema.

Biography
He made his screen debut in 1953, but his first truly memorable role was in the 1957 film Nije bilo uzalud. In this film, like in many others, he played the villain, but he turned out to be the most memorable character. Later he built on this reputation and continued to play important historical and larger-than-life characters.

Tadić also made history by uttering an obscenity in one of the final scenes of 1964 World War I epic Marš na Drinu, which was the first such instance in the history of former Yugoslav cinema.

Selected filmography

Notes

References

External links

1929 births
2005 deaths
People from Ferizaj
Serbian male actors
Serbian male television actors
Serbian male film actors
Serbian male stage actors
Serbian male voice actors
Golden Arena winners
Laureates of the Ring of Dobrica
Croatian Theatre Award winners
Burials at Belgrade New Cemetery
Kosovo Serbs
20th-century Serbian male actors
20th-century Serbian writers
Serbian dramatists and playwrights